Robin Tabeling (born 24 April 1994) is a Dutch badminton player, specializing in doubles play. He started playing badminton in Amstelveen at a club called BV van Zijderveld. He won a silver medal at the 2013 European Junior Championships in the mixed doubles event and a bronze medal in team event. Partnered with Jelle Maas, he won bronze medals at the 2018 European Championships and 2019 European Games. He competed at the 2020 Summer Olympics.

Achievements

European Games 
Men's doubles

European Championships 
Men's doubles

Mixed doubles

European Junior Championships 
Mixed doubles

BWF World Tour (1 title, 2 runners-up) 
The BWF World Tour, which was announced on 19 March 2017 and implemented in 2018, is a series of elite badminton tournaments sanctioned by the Badminton World Federation (BWF). The BWF World Tour is divided into levels of World Tour Finals, Super 1000, Super 750, Super 500, Super 300, and the BWF Tour Super 100.

Men's doubles

Mixed doubles

BWF Grand Prix (1 title) 
The BWF Grand Prix had two levels, the Grand Prix and Grand Prix Gold. It was a series of badminton tournaments sanctioned by the Badminton World Federation (BWF) and played between 2007 and 2017.

Men's doubles

  BWF Grand Prix Gold tournament
  BWF Grand Prix tournament

BWF International Challenge/Series (6 titles, 6 runners-up) 
Men's doubles

Mixed doubles

  BWF International Challenge tournament
  BWF International Series tournament
  BWF Future Series tournament

References

External links 
 
 Robin Tabeling Websites

1994 births
Living people
Sportspeople from Amstelveen
Dutch male badminton players
Badminton players at the 2020 Summer Olympics
Olympic badminton players of the Netherlands
Badminton players at the 2019 European Games
European Games bronze medalists for the Netherlands
European Games medalists in badminton
21st-century Dutch people